Uppony is a village in Borsod-Abaúj-Zemplén county, Hungary.

Uppony is located in the north of Hungary, 45 kilometers from the county capital Miskolc.

External links 
 Street map 
  
 Geonames.org

Populated places in Borsod-Abaúj-Zemplén County